Rodolphe Louis Mégroz (2 August 1891 – 30 September 1968) was a prolific English writer, critic and poet. He was born in London, with a French father and English mother. He worked in a bank before World War I, in which he served in the British Army at Gallipoli.

After the war Mégroz trained as a journalist, and worked as a freelance. He also wrote numerous books, and stories. During World War II he worked for the BBC.

Works
Personal Poems (1919)
A talk with Joseph Conrad and a criticism of his mind and method (1926)
The Three Sitwells; a biographical and critical study (1927) 
Francis Thompson: The Poet of Earth in Heaven. A Study in Poetic Mysticism and the Evolution of Love-Poetry (1927) (Faber & Gwyer)
Ronald Ross, discoverer and creator (1931)
Rhys Davies. A Critical Sketch (1932)
The Lear Omnibus (1938)
The Real Robinson Crusoe (1939)
Dante Gabriel Rossetti, painter poet of heaven in earth 
Profile Art Through the Ages: A Study of the Use and significance of Profile and Silhouette from the Stone Age to Puppet Films
Shakespeare as a Letter Writer and Artist in Prose
Walter de la Mare: A Biography and Critical Study (1972)

Notes

External links
 

1891 births
1968 deaths
English male poets
20th-century English poets
20th-century English male writers